Robert Galloway and Roberto Maytín were the defending champions but chose not to defend their title.

Leandro Riedi and Valentin Vacherot won the title after defeating Ezekiel Clark and Alfredo Perez 6–7(2–7), 6–3, [10–2] in the final.

Seeds

Draw

References

External links
 Main draw

Tiburon Challenger - Doubles
2022 Doubles